William Joseph Benson (born March 5, 1988) is an American former professional baseball outfielder. He played in Major League Baseball (MLB) for the Minnesota Twins during the 2011 season.

College career
Benson attended Joliet Catholic Academy in Joliet, Illinois. Benson played baseball and American football at Joliet, and was recruited to play college football for the Purdue Boilermakers football team as a running back.

Professional career

Minnesota Twins
The Minnesota Twins selected Benson in the second round of the 2006 Major League Baseball Draft. Benson signed with the Twins rather than attend Purdue.

Benson participated in spring training for the Twins in 2011, but did not make the opening day roster and was subsequently assigned to the AA affiliate of the Twins, the New Britain Rock Cats, where he was given the starting job in center field.  On September 6, 2011, Benson made his major league debut for the Minnesota Twins. He went without a hit a three at-bats, drawing a walk and striking out once.  Benson's first major league hit was a single off of Detroit Tigers pitcher Max Scherzer on September 10, 2011.

In 2013, Benson competed with Aaron Hicks for the starting centerfield position with the Twins. Hicks won the job, and Benson went to the Rochester Red Wings of the Class AAA International League. In May 2013, the Twins put Benson on outright waivers to clear a roster spot for P. J. Walters.

Texas Rangers
On May 25, 2013, Benson was claimed off waivers by the Texas Rangers. On September 1, 2013, Benson was designated for assignment and he was outrighted on September 3. On November 4, 2013, Benson elected free agency.

Miami Marlins
Benson signed a minor league deal with the Miami Marlins on January 9, 2014, and spent most of the season with Double–A Jacksonville Suns.

Atlanta Braves
In January 2015, Benson signed a minor league deal with the Atlanta Braves. He was released by the Braves in mid June.

New York Mets
Benson signed a minor league deal with the New York Mets on July 11, 2015. He elected free agency on November 6, 2015.

Return to Minnesota
On November 30, 2015 Benson signed a minor league deal with the Minnesota Twins. He was released in March 2016.

Sugar Land Skeeters
Benson signed with the Sugar Land Skeeters of the Atlantic League of Professional Baseball for the 2017 season. He became a free agent after the 2017 season.

Chicago Dogs
On May 8, 2018, Benson signed with the Chicago Dogs of the American Association. He was released on April 30, 2019.

Southern Maryland Blue Crabs
On June 4, 2019, Benson signed with the Southern Maryland Blue Crabs of the Atlantic League of Professional Baseball. He became a free agent following the season.

References

External links

1988 births
Living people
Baseball players from Illinois
People from Hinsdale, Illinois
Major League Baseball outfielders
Minnesota Twins players
Gulf Coast Twins players
Beloit Snappers players
Fort Myers Miracle players
New Britain Rock Cats players
Rochester Red Wings players
Frisco RoughRiders players
Arizona League Rangers players
New Orleans Zephyrs players
Jacksonville Suns players
Peoria Saguaros players
Tigres de Aragua players
American expatriate baseball players in Venezuela
Gwinnett Braves players
Sugar Land Skeeters players
Chicago Dogs players
Southern Maryland Blue Crabs players